Bear Brook may refer to:

Streams
Canada
Bear Brook (Ontario)

Englans
Bear Brook, tributary to the River Thame

United States
Bear Brook (Suncook River tributary), New Hampshire
Bear Brook (Pascack Brook tributary), New Jersey
Bear Brook (Millstone River tributary), New Jersey
Bear Brook (Baxter Brook tributary), New York
Bear Brook (Sands Creek tributary), New York
Bear Brook (Roaring Brook tributary), Pennsylvania

Other uses
Bear Brook, Newfoundland and Labrador, a former community in Canada
Bear Brook State Park, New Hampshire
Bear Brook murders, four murder victims discovered in Bear Brook State Park
Bear Brook (podcast), a podcast about the Bear Brook murders

See also

 Bear Creek (disambiguation)
 Bear River (disambiguation)
 Bear Lake (disambiguation)